Francesco Colombo may refer to:
 Francesco Colombo (gymnast)
 Francesco Colombo (soldier)